Rémerson dos Santos, shortly Rémerson (born July 13, 1972 in Barra Mansa, Rio de Janeiro) is a Brazilian footballer who plays as a central defender for Náutico.

Honours
Campeonato Paulista in 1990 with Bragantino
Campeonato Catarinense in 1996 with Chapecoense
Campeonato Pernambucano in 2002 with Náutico

References

External links
 

1972 births
Living people
Brazilian footballers
Brazilian expatriate footballers
Association football defenders
Associação Portuguesa de Desportos players
Clube Atlético Bragantino players
Associação Chapecoense de Futebol players
Joinville Esporte Clube players
Santa Cruz Futebol Clube players
Ulsan Hyundai FC players
K League 1 players
Expatriate footballers in South Korea
Clube Náutico Capibaribe players
Brazilian expatriate sportspeople in South Korea
Sportspeople from Rio de Janeiro (state)
People from Barra Mansa